is Japanese idol group AKB48's debut single, released independently through AKS on February 1, 2006. The single was the highest debuting girl group single since Morning Musume's "Morning Coffee", released in 1998. The song was composed by Hiroshi Uesugi and written by Yasushi Akimoto.  The song was re-recorded and released again in 2008 as the group's final single with major label DefStar Records. The song was sung by the original 21 members of AKB48 that later formed Team A. Center of 2006 version was Minami Takahashi. while 2008 version was Minami Takahashi and Atsuko Maeda.

Promotion

The launching of "Sakura no Hanabiratachi" was held on February 1, 2006, at the AKB48 theater. During this event, a video presentation of the events that occurred during the formation of Team A was shown.  20 Members of AKB48 Team A then performed "Sakura no Hanabiratachi" and "Dear My Teacher," and later introduced themselves one by one to the public. Notable during this event was the absence of Tomomi Ōe due to school activities.

The song was used as the theme song of the TBS drama Desu yo Nee., along with being used in videophone commercials for NTT docomo. The B-side "Dear My Teacher" was used as the ending theme song for the variety show Mitake Uranai.

The re-released version had several tie-ups. The lead track was used as an ending theme song for the variety show Arabiki-dan, while the B-side "Saigo no Seifuku" was used as an image song for the 26th Yokohama International Women's Ekiden.

2008 version

The Team K and Team B members were invited to join in creating a new 2008 version of the song, . A poster was given for a purchase of any version of this single at the AKB48 Theater Café. Since only one member from AKB48 was featured on each poster, 44 different types of posters were available. These posters were handed out randomly to any purchaser. Anyone who had collected all 44 types had been invited to a Spring Festival with AKB48. DefSTAR Records later announced, however, that this offer would be cancelled, due to the apparent scandal of attracting purchasers to effectively buy a special reward by spending an inordinate amount of money chasing down all 44 versions of the poster.

A special B-side is featured on the type B limited edition, where the song is rearranged into the form of a school choir performance.

2010 version

2015 version
For the group's 10th anniversary, a new version of the song (along with Skirt, Hirari) was recorded for the opening track of upcoming album 0 to 1 no Aida, featuring current members.

Reception
The single debuted at #10 in its first week, with 22,000 copies sold. It charted for a further three weeks in the top 50, before finally leaving the top 200 eight weeks after its initial chart entry, having doubled the sales from the first week.

The 2008 version was less commercially successful. While it also debuted at #10 with 22,000 copies sold in its first week, it only spent a single week in the top 50, leaving the charts five weeks after its initial week, selling a total of 25,000 copies.

This was the best-selling single from AKB48's independent period and their time under major label DefStar Records. The record would only be broken by their first single with King Records in 2008, "Ōgoe Diamond", which sold over 80,000 copies.

Track listing

Charts

Reported sales

Personnel
Produced By: Yasushi Akimoto
Executive Producer: Yasushi Kubota, Kotaro Shiba
Creative Direction and Photography and Edit: Yasumasa Yonehara
Photography: Hirohisa Sako
Hair and Make Up: Hiromi Kawano
Design: Takumi Matsubara

Other versions
 The Indonesian idol group JKT48, a sister group of AKB48, covered the song and named it "Kelopak-Kelopak Bunga Sakura". It was included on single Gingham Check. It was also performed on funerary of Inao Jiro, general manager.
 The Thai idol group BNK48, a sister group of AKB48, covered the song and named it "Khwamsongcham Lae Kham-amla" ("Memories and Farewell"). It was included in the group's third single, "Shonichi – Wan Raek", released on 7 May 2018. The ghost of a girl reportedly appeared while this song was performed at the group's theatre, BNK48 The Campus, giving rise to the rumour that the place was haunted.
 The Filipino idol group MNL48, a sister group of AKB48, covered the song and named it "Talulot ng Sakura" It was released as a B-side to their debut single "Aitakatta - Gustong Makita", in 2018.
 The Chinese idol group SNH48, a former sister group of AKB48, covered the song and named it "Qingchun de Huaban" (青春的花瓣)
The Taiwanese idol group AKB48 Team TP, covered the song and named it "Yinghua pan" (櫻花瓣), a coupling song from their debut single Yungwang chihch'ien.

References 

AKB48 songs
BNK48 songs
MNL48 songs
2006 debut singles
Songs with lyrics by Yasushi Akimoto
Japanese-language songs
Songs about cherry blossom
2006 songs